Ascenseur pour l'échafaud is an album by jazz musician Miles Davis. It was recorded at Le Poste Parisien Studio in Paris on December 4 and 5, 1957. The album features the musical cues for the 1958 Louis Malle film Ascenseur pour l'échafaud.

Background 
Jean-Paul Rappeneau, a jazz fan and Malle's assistant at the time, suggested asking Miles Davis to create the film's soundtrack – possibly inspired by the Modern Jazz Quartet's recording for Roger Vadim's Sait-on jamais (Lit: 'Does One Ever Know', released as: No Sun in Venice), released a few months earlier in 1957.

Davis was booked to perform at the Club Saint-Germain in Paris during November 1957. Rappeneau introduced him to Malle, and Davis agreed to record the music after attending a private screening. On December 4, he brought his four sidemen to the recording studio without having had them prepare anything. Davis only gave the musicians a few rudimentary harmonic sequences he had assembled in his hotel room, and, once the plot was explained, the band improvised without any precomposed theme, while edited loops of the musically relevant film sequences were projected in the background.

Release and reception 
In Europe, the soundtrack was originally released as a 10 inch LP on the Fontana label. In America it was released by Columbia as side one of the album Jazz Track  (CL 1268), with the second side filled by three new tracks recorded with his regular sextet (later to be re-released on the 1958 Miles CD). Jazz Track received a 1960 Grammy nomination for Best Jazz Performance, Solo or Small Group. The CD edition, released internationally by Fontana/Polygram in  the late '80s, contains the original soundtrack material, versions of the original album tracks without the reverb that was added to the initial release, and several previously unreleased alternate takes.

In the opinion of Romina Daniele, the musical mood and characteristics of the soundtrack immediately preceded and introduced Miles Davis's subsequent records Milestones (1958) and Kind of Blue (1959).

Track listings

10" LP 
Side one

Side two

CD 

Note: The track listing above refers to the currently available CD version. The original soundtrack to the film, as mixed and edited (with additional reverb) in 1958, and used for the screen, can be heard in tracks 17 to 26.

Personnel
 Miles Davis – trumpet
 Barney Wilen – tenor saxophone
 René Urtreger – piano
 Pierre Michelot – bass
 Kenny Clarke – drums

References 

1958 soundtrack albums
Crime film soundtracks
Fontana Records soundtracks
Miles Davis soundtracks
Single-artist film soundtracks